The 1938 municipal election was held November 9, 1938 to elect a mayor and five aldermen to sit on Edmonton City Council and three trustees to sit on the public school board, while three trustees were acclaimed to the separate school board.  Voters also rejected two proposals to borrow money from other levels of government for the construction of new housing.

There were ten aldermen on city council, but five of the positions were already filled: Edward Brown, Frederick Casselman, Douglas Grout (SS), George Campbell, and Dan Knott were all elected to two-year terms in 1937 and were still in office.

There were seven trustees on the public school board, but four of the positions were already filled: Albert Ottewell (SS), Walter Morrish, Sidney Bowcott, and Bruce Smith had been elected to two-year terms in 1937 and were still in office.  The same was true on the separate school board, where Hugh Currie, Charles Gariepy, William Wilde (SS), and John Whelihan were continuing.

Voter turnout

There were 23,599 ballots cast out of 53,848 eligible voters, for a voter turnout of 43.8%.

Results

 bold or  indicates elected
 italics indicate incumbent
 "SS", where data is available, indicates representative for Edmonton's South Side, with a minimum South Side representation instituted after the city of Strathcona, south of the North Saskatchewan River, amalgamated into Edmonton on February 1, 1912.

Mayor

Aldermen

The civic Progressive party, with candidates for alderman and public school trustee, represented a "united  front" of the Communist Party, the Social Credit movement and other leftist reformers.

Public school trustees

Separate (Catholic) school trustees

Adrien Crowe (SS), James O'Hara, and J O Pilon were acclaimed.

Plebiscites

Low Income Housing

Are you in favour of the city borrowing from the Dominion or Provincial governments, to construct low cost dwelling houses in Edmonton, for rental purposes only, a sum not exceeding $250,000, repayable in from 20 to 35 years, with interest not exceeding two per cent per annum?
Yes - 2,687
No - 3,593

Regular Housing

Are you in favour of the city borrowing from the Dominion or Provincial governments, for the purpose of loaning to individuals to construct dwelling houses in Edmonton, a sum not exceeding $250,000, repayable in from 20 to 35 years at a rate of interest not exceeding five percent per annum?
Yes - 2,430
No - 3,578

References

Election History, City of Edmonton: Elections and Census Office

1938
1938 elections in Canada
1938 in Alberta